Francesco Salerno (1962–7 April 2006), better known as "Frank the Bammer" was a Canadian outlaw biker and gangster, who was one of the victims of the Shedden massacre.

Loner
Salerno was born in Toronto, the son of a car dealer. Salerno's life fell apart as a child when his parents divorced. Salerno joined the Loners Motorcycle Club as an young man. Salerno had a long criminal record for fraud, theft, and drug possession with more than thirty convictions. Salerno was addicted to heroin, which was the cause of his pressing financial problems. Salerno had a reputation as a bumbling, inept character. He once caused the Loners' clubhouse in Richmond Hill to burn down, when he fell asleep while he was supposed to be watching a fire. Those who knew Salerno considered him to be dishonest with one friend saying: "Salerno had more angles than a geometry class". On 24 November 1998, Salerno robbed a Hy & Zel's drugstore in Niagara Falls, stealing 13 cartons of cigarettes. On 28 April 2000, he was found guilty of theft over $5,000 dollars over the incident and sentenced to twenty days in prison. Salerno's lawyer, Donald Wolfe, told the court: "He came to the Niagara region to go to the casino and he lost money, to the extent that he didn't feel he'd be able to make it home again".

Bandidos
In December 2001, Salerno joined the Bandidos. Salerno became very close to another Bandido and fellow Italian-Canadian Giovanni Muscedere.  Salerno and Muscedere often talked in Italian and seemed to understand each very well. When Muscedere became the Bandidos Canadian national president in June 2002, he appointed Salerno the president of the Toronto chapter.

In 2002-2004, Salerno became locked in a feud with Frank Lenti. Lenti disliked Salerno as a heroin addict while Lenti refused to even smoke cigarettes, saying that abusing drugs were for weak men. When Salerno gave himself a bastone tattoo, which Lenti saw as own personal mark, Lenti proceeded to give Salerno a beating and told him to have his bastone tattoo removed or covered up. When Lenti discovered insulting comments about himself on the Bandidos Canadian website, he discovered that the IP address of the person who posted the comments was located in area of Oakville where Salerno lived, which led him to accuse Salerno of being the one who insulted him. Salerno broke down in tears and told Lenti "please, please, please" not gorge out his eyes as a punishment.

In October 2002, Salerno's life improved when he married a woman named Stephanie. Salerno had been morbidly obese, but at his wife's urging, he dieted and lost weight. Stephanie Salerno owned a successful beauty salon, whose income allowed the couple to own a house in a middle-class district of Oakville. Salerno often stated: "I feel like a loser. My wife's the one making the money. I do all the housework". Salerno himself could not manage his finances and he often left restaurants without paying for his meals. Salerno's long criminal record made it difficult for him to find work and he supported himself by smuggling contraband cigarettes from the Mohawk reserves. He was in debt with his fellow clubmates and lacked enough money on his own to pay an automobile mechanic $400 dollars for the work he had done repairing his used BMW automobile. Peter Edwards, the crime correspondent of The Toronto Star, noted that Salerno was talking about finding a legitimate job to help him pay off his debts "...is some indication of the Toronto Bandidos' success as criminals".  

On 28 December 2005, the American leadership of the Bandidos, who had grown increasingly unhappy with Muscedere's leadership, expelled him and his followers, charging that they were failing to make money, not paying their monthly membership dues because they did not have the money, and were going about business in a "sloppy" manner, leaving them wide open to prosecution. An officer with the Texas Department of Public Safety told the journalist Julien Sher of The Globe and Mail in 2006: "Because their numbers were so low in Canada, the U.S. Bandidos had tried to separate themselves from Canada. When you get to the point when you're not even breaking even – on drugs, like any other trade – you decide to close the business. If you're not bringing anything into the pot, you're a liability instead of an asset". Moreover, since the American leadership of the Bandidos all had criminal records, it was impossible for them to legally visit Canada. This led to the Canadian branch of the Bandidos being widely seen as a badly functioning rogue operation who refused to communicate properly.

On 4 January 2006, Salerno sent an email to Houston to William Sartelle, the world secretary of the Bandidos entitled "My Life". Salerno wrote: "I'm sitting here feeling confused, dejected, emotionally drained. I can't remember feeling as badly unless I count the time I was informed that Brother Tout Tout and the time Brother Crazy Horse Joey were assassinated. You see Bill, I've been with this Great Nation since its inception in Ontario...At that time there was 7 of us here in Ontario. We were surrounded by no less than 6 H.A. [Hells Angels] chapters within a 50 mile radius. As you see, they tried everything in their power to shut us down. We have been decimated with betrayal, defection to other clubs, law enforcement but We stood tall and wore our colours proud...Bill, being a Bandido in good standing is my world. Quit frankly, I resent have to go through this. I have always done the nation proud". 

In defense of Muscedere-whom the American Bandidos complained had never visited their headquarters in Houston-Salerno emailed to Carleton "Pervert" Bare, the secretary of Bandidos USA, that Muscedere had tried 5 times to visit Houston, but was "turned down every time and the last time detained until he was deemed an undesirable and escorted back to Canadian soil. The next time he is caught trying to enter he will face criminal charges". A reprieve was won for the "no-surrender crew" when George Kriarakis visited Houston to meet the American Bandido leaders and was able to buy time by being appointed their national president. Salerno had talked of his wish to leave the Bandidos, but with the threat of expulsion, he seemed determined to stay. On 25 February 2006 Salerno demoted David Weiche, the best friend of Wayne Kellestine, from a "full patch" member down to a "prospect" member for maintaining unauthorized contact with the American Bandidos. The message was returned to Salerno as undeliverable.

Salerno's wife, Stephanie, had just given birth to a son, Mario, and like Diane Kriarakis, the wife of George Kriarakis she often pressed her husband to leave the Bandidos. Salerno assured his wife that he wanted to quit the Bandidos, saying the outlaw biker lifestyle was not for him, but kept procrastinating about when he was going to resign. Salerno told his wife: "Do you think this is like a bowling club? Do you think I can just walk away?" Salerno, the president of the Toronto chapter once told a friend: "I'm not the best-looking guy. I'm not Mr. Workaholic, bringing home a lot of money. But I'm not a womanizer. I don't cheat on her [Stephanie]. I also don't abuse her. I do my best, within my abilities". In his last months alive, Salerno had founded a strippers' agency, which he named Playboyz Productions, to supply both male and female strippers for stag and stagette parties in the Toronto area. In late March 2006, Salerno sent Pierre "Carlitto" Aragon to Winnipeg to see Michael Sandham, the president of the Winnipeg chapter and Edwards wrote that "...the police would later hear that Carlitto and Stone were in Winnipeg to kill Sandham". Salerno had plans to install Argaon as the new Winnipeg chapter president to remove Sandham, who had emerged as a troubler-maker within the Bandidos.

The Shedden massacre
At the beginning of April 2006, Kellestine accused one of the Toronto chapter, Jamie Flanz, of being a police informer. Muscedere agreed that a meeting would be held at Kellestine's farmhouse to discuss the allegations. In a phone call that listened into by the police,  Salerno told the Toronto chapter treasurer Paul Sinopoli that if he failed to attend the meeting and bring some $550 he owed in arrears to the club he would be expelled.  Salerno stated: "Bro, uh, Boxer's freaking out, bro. You're on your last legs, you're almost out of the door. So if I was you, I'd get yourself to church today". Salerno told Sinopoli to bring money to the meeting, saying: "You better bring it. Don't come there empty-handed, brother, and don't bother phonin' him and telling him you're sick". When Sinopoli stated he was very unwell, Salerno told him: "I'm telling you what to do. If you don't want to listen to me, that's your problem. Don't come crying to me after". Sinopoli finally reluctantly agreed to attend the meeting. 

Salerno then phoned another Bandido Pierre "Carlito" Aragon-who was in Winnipeg at the time-in an intercepted call when he stated: "Yeah, brother, I don't know what the agenda is out there, but...uh...its not to have diner at fuckin's J.C.'s house, that's for sure, ya know what I mean? I suggest you call this call this fuckin' Taz [Sandham] fuckin's piece of shit and order him as a Canada Rocker [full patch] to get his fuckin' ass to where you are. What is this, a fuckin' joke?" Salerno continued on in his profanity-laced rant against Sandham and urged Aragon to steal the assets of the Winnipeg chapter. As his baby son Mario was heard crying in the background, Salerno ended his call telling Aragon: "So bro, do the things you were sent to do...People are livid and freakin". After hanging up, Salerno kissed his son, said "take care of your mommy" and left for Kellestine's farmhouse.

As the Toronto chapter entered Kellestine's barn at about 10 pm on 7 April 2006, Sandham shot and killed Luis Raposo. At the sound of the shots, both Sinopoli and Kriarakis attempted to flee, but Kellestine shot both of them down with Kriarakis taking a bullet to the abdomen while Sinpoli was shot in the thigh. During the same exchange of gunfire, Salerno was also hit by a bullet in his leg.  As both Sinopoli and Kriarakis complained of the pain caused by their wounds, Salerno told them: "We're bikers. We're not the fucking Boy Scouts, so stop your whining". Despite the pain caused by the bullet wound in his leg, Salerno refused to complain. Several times, Kellestine kicked Salerno in the head and called him a "fucking goof" (an insult that is considered to be the worse insult in the Canadian underworld). As Kriarkis said he was sad that he was never see his wife again, Salaerno told him: "You know how the game is played. We're not Boy Scouts". Salerno was picked up from the floor and placed in a white plastic chair while awaiting for his time to die. As he waited to die, Salerno said the Lord's Prayer, asking God to forgive him for his sins and to allow his soul to enter heaven.

When Salerno was taken out to be shot, he offered to shake hands with his killers. He shook hands with Dwight Mushey while another man known as M.H. and Marcello Aravena refused as the latter said: "I'm not shaking your hand!". Salerno shouted as he taken out to be shotv was to think of his newly born son Mario. Salerno's last words were "Make sure you guys tell my family where my body is" before a shot silenced him. The police discovered that Salerno's corpse was the most shot up of all the eight victims, having taken bullets to the nose, right cheek, right thigh, lower right right leg, right hand, and left ear. The autopsy revealed that Salerno had much heroin in his blood at the time of his murder, suggesting that he was still abusing heroin.

At the trial of the killers in 2009, Salerno's mother, Marilyn Salerno, told the court: "During the evidence of the wire-tap conversations I continually heard the expression 'Love, loyalty and respect', apparently a mantra of the Bandidos club. Each time I heard those words I cringed. Where was the love, loyalty and respect...when our loved ones were ambushed and murdered by their so-called brothers?"

Books

References

1962 births
2006 deaths
Shedden massacre
People murdered by Canadian organized crime
21st-century Canadian criminals
Canadian gangsters
Canadian male criminals
Bandidos Motorcycle Club
Murder in Ontario
2006 in Ontario